Stephanie Barrett (born January 26, 1979) is a Canadian archer. Barrett took up the sport at 37, and has been practising the sport since a few weeks before the 2016 Summer Olympics.

Career
Barrett began practising archery in 2016, and came first in the Canadian Field and Target Championships in 2018. She competed at the 2019 Pan American Games in Lima, Peru, where she finished tied for 17th in the individual recurve, tied fifth for team and fourth in the mixed team.

In March 2021, Barrett claimed one of three available quota places for the 2020 Summer Olympics in the women's individual recurve at the 2021 Pan American Archery Championships in Monterrey, Mexico, where she won silver. Barrett was officially nominated to the team on May 12, 2021. A week later at the World Cup stop in Lausanne, Switzerland, Barrett scored a 652 in the qualification round, the highest ever by a Canadian woman in an international competition. Barrett competed in women's individual archery at the Olympics in July 2021. At the qualifiers, she ranked #46 out of 64 with a score of 630; she and Crispin Duenas did not have a high enough combined score to qualify for the mixed team event. She lost her individual match with Yasemin Anagoz 6–2.

References

1979 births
Canadian female archers
Living people
Archers at the 2019 Pan American Games
Sportspeople from Newmarket, Ontario
Pan American Games competitors for Canada
Olympic archers of Canada
Archers at the 2020 Summer Olympics
20th-century Canadian women
21st-century Canadian women